The 54th New York Film Festival was held September 30 - October 16, 2016.

The lineup consisted of eight sections:
 Main Slate (25 films and five shorts programs)
 Spotlight on Documentary (15 films)
 Explorations (six films)
 Projections (11 programs)
 Special Events (six films)
 Revivals (12 films)
 Retrospective (19 films)
 Convergence (trans-media presentations and talks)

The Festival also included various talks and free screenings. The "Explorations" section was a new addition in 2016, described by the Festival as: "This new section is devoted to work from around the world, from filmmakers across the spectrum of experience and artistic sensibility. […] The one quality that they share is that they are adventurous and exploratory, in the very best sense of the word." The primary selection committee included Kent Jones (chair), Dennis Lim, Florence Almozini, Amy Taubin, and Gavin Smith as a consultant. The Shorts Programs were selected by Dilcia Barrera, Laura Kern, Dennis Lim, Gabi Madsen and Dan Sullivan. Projections was programmed by Dennis Lim and Aily Nash. The Revivals and Retrospective sections were programmed by Kent Jones, and Convergence was curated by Matt Bolish.

Sections

Main Slate

Feature-length

Shorts

Spotlight on Documentary

Explorations

Projections

Special Events

Revivals

Retrospective 
The 2016 Retrospective contained two programs, both inspired by Bertrand Tavernier. “A Brief Journey Through French Cinema” screened Tavernier’s My Journey Through French Cinema along with several titles cited in the film. The second program focused on Henry Hathaway, a director Tavernier particularly admires.

A Brief Journey Through French Cinema

Henry Hathaway

References

New York Film Festival
2016 festivals in the United States
2016 film festivals
2016 in New York City